"Whenever" is a song by Dutch DJs Kris Kross Amsterdam and The Boy Next Door released in 2018 featuring vocals by English singer Conor Maynard. The song, released by Virgin Records and Spinnin' Records, was a hit throughout Europe. It is an adaptation and rearrangement of the Shakira song "Whenever, Wherever" with new lyrics and new musical compositions. The refrain samples Shakira's release.

Charts

Weekly charts

Year-end charts

Certifications

References

2018 songs
2018 singles
Conor Maynard songs
Songs written by Shakira
Songs written by Gloria Estefan
Songs written by Will Grands